Small Fry: A Memoir is a 2018 memoir by Lisa Brennan-Jobs, daughter of Steve Jobs.

Synopsis
A New York Times review says that "Brennan-Jobs herself never addresses the question of his legacy; her book is written from the perspective of a child longing for a father." It covers her childhood in Palo Alto with her mother, and her father's estrangement. It details emotional abuse, with Jobs even failing to name her as one of his children in later years.

Reception
The review aggregator website, Book Marks, rated the memoir "Rave" based on 18 critic reviews. The New York Times gave it a positive review, calling it an "entrancing memoir" from a "deeply gifted writer" with a "singular sensibility". It concludes that "in the fallen world of kiss-and-tell celebrity memoirs, this may be the most beautiful, literary and devastating one ever written."

References 

 

2018 non-fiction books
American memoirs
Books about Steve Jobs
Grove Press books